Muuruejärvi is a medium-sized lake of Finland. It is situated in Viitasaari, between two rapids, Huopanankoski and Keihärinkoski.

See also
List of lakes in Finland

References
  (English version may be available.)

Lakes of Viitasaari